Shota Shamatava was a member of the second convocation of the People's Assembly of Abkhazia, from 1996 to 2002. He was elected in constituency no. 33 after the citrus farm Apsny had suggested his candidacy. Before entering Parliament, he had been Mayor of the village Okum in Tkvarcheli District. Shamatava was born on 17 July 1936 and died on 28 October 2013 in Sukhumi.

References

2nd convocation of the People's Assembly of Abkhazia
Abkhazian politicians
1936 births
2013 deaths